Mars RK, also known as MRK Airlines, was a Ukrainian charter airline based in the Kyiv International Airport (Zhuliany).

Fleet

The Mars RK fleet included the following aircraft as of January 2013:

2 Saab 340A 
2 Diamond DA42 Twin Star

Mars RK had signed a deal to purchase three Chinese Xian MA60 in 2012.

References

External links
Official website

Defunct airlines of Ukraine